Hai is a 2002 Indian Telugu-language romantic drama film directed by E. V. V. Satyanarayana. He introduces his son Aryan Rajesh and newcomer Nikita.

Plot 
Aryan Rajesh and Priya are in love. Priya's father wants to test if Aryan Rajesh is truly in love with her.

Cast 

Aryan Rajesh as Aryan Rajesh
Nikita as Priya
Prakash Raj as Priya's father
Chandramohan 
Jayasudha
Chalapathi Rao
Mallikarjuna Rao
L. B. Sriram
 Surya Ganesh
Sana
Benarjee
Khayyum
Chitram Seenu
 Babloo

Production
Newcomer Nikita from Mumbai was signed as the heroine. A hotel set was erected in Dubai.

Soundtrack 
Music by Koti.
"Ninnu Choosina" lyrics by Sirivennela Seetharama Sastry and sung by Sandeep and Sujatha.
"Premalo Paddadurao" lyrics by Surendra Krishna and sung by Sri Ram Prabhu, Tippu, Koti, Murali, Kannan, and Saroja.
"Hai Re Hai" lyrics by Surendra Krishna and sung by R.P. Patnaik and Usha.
"Manasoorukode lyrics by Surendra Krishna and sung by Tippu, Harini.
"Excuse Me" lyrics by Sirivennela Seetharama Sastry and sung by Devi, Sanjay Krishna Mohan, Raghu, Usha, and Radhika.
"Tante Padipoya"  lyrics by Chandra Bose and sung by Rajesh and Sujatha.

Reception 
A critic from Sify opined that "The script and presentation are weak and even the music of Koti is disappointing. Aryan Rajesh needs to brush up his acting and to concentrate on his dancing as his movements lack grace. Nikhita looks glamorous in those skimpy clothes and has the potential to go places". Jeevi of Idlebrain.com wrote that "Over all it's an average film. You can watch it once at your leisure". Kiran Nadella of Full Hyderabad gave the film a negative review and said that "Because every single scene save for some good sceneries will urge you to slide off your chair and smash your skull into the floor, and I bet you will enjoy it better that way".

References

Notes